Žeje ( or) is a village in the Municipality of Naklo in the Upper Carniola region of Slovenia.

References

External links

Žeje on Geopedia

Populated places in the Municipality of Naklo